Sophrosyne is an ancient Greek concept of an ideal of excellence of character and soundness of mind, which when combined in one well-balanced individual leads to other qualities, such as temperance, moderation, prudence, purity, decorum, and self-control. An adjectival form is "sophron." 

It is similar to the concepts of zhōngyōng (中庸) of Chinese Confucianism and sattva of Indian thought.

Ancient Greek literature

In Ancient Greek literature, sophrosyne is considered an important quality and is sometimes expressed in opposition to the concept of hubris. A noted example of this occurs in Homer's The Iliad. When Agamemnon decides to take the queen Briseis away from Achilles, it is seen as Agamemnon behaving with hubris and lacking sophrosyne. In Homer's Odyssey, Odysseus avoids being turned by Circe the enchantress into an animal by means of a magical herb, moly (symbolizing, by some accounts, sophrosyne), given to him by Athena (Wisdom) and Hermes (Reason).

Heraclitus's fragment 112 states:

Themes connected with sophrosyne and hubris figure prominently in plays of Aeschylus, Sophocles and Euripides; sophrosyne is recognized as a virtue, although debased forms like prudery are criticized. Sophrosyne is a theme in the play Hippolytus by Euripides, where sophrosyne is represented by the goddess Artemis and is personified by the character Hippolytus.

Goddess
The 6th-century BC poet Theognis of Megara mentions Sophrosyne as among the daimona that were released from Pandora's box.

Hope is the only good god remaining among mankind;
the others have left and gone to Olympus.
Trust, a mighty god has gone, Restraint (Sophrosyne) has gone from men,
and the Graces, my friend, have abandoned the earth.

The De Astronomica lists Continentia among the daughters of Erebus and Nyx, who is thought to be the Roman equivalent of Sophrosyne.

Plato

Sophrosyne is an important topic for Plato. It is the main subject of the dialogue Charmides, wherein several definitions are proposed but no conclusion reached; however the dramatic context connotes moral purity and innocence. An etymological meaning of sophrosyne as "moral sanity" is proposed in Cratylus 411e. Plato's view of sophrosyne is related to Pythagorean harmonia (Republic 430e−432a, 442c) and closely linked with Plato’s 
tripartite division of the soul: sophrosyne is the harmonious moderation of the appetitive and spirited parts of the soul by the rational part (e.g., Phaedrus 237c−238e).

After Plato

For the Stoic, Zeno of Citium, sophrosyne is one of the four chief virtues. Later Stoics like Musonius Rufus, Seneca, Epictetus, and Marcus Aurelius took a practical view of sophrosyne and share a definition of it as the restraint of the appetites. 

Demophilus, a Pythagorean philosopher of uncertain date, wrote:

Cicero considered four Latin terms to translate sophrosyne: temperantia (temperance), moderatio (moderateness), modestia (modesty) and frugalitas (frugality). Through the writings of Lactantius, St. Ambrose and St. Augustine, the virtue's meaning as temperance or "proper mixture" became the dominant view in subsequent Western European thought.

Sophrosyne, according to St. Thomas Aquinas, is the fourth and final cardinal virtue.

It is also mentioned in the work On Virtues by Georgios Gemistos Plethon.

See also 

 Seven virtues

References

Further reading 
 North, Helen F. 1947. "A period of opposition to sôphrosynê in Greek thought." Transactions and Proceedings of the American Philological Association 78:1–17.
 — 1966. Sophrosyne: Self-knowledge and self-restraint in Greek literature. Ithaca, NY: Cornell University Press.
 Rademaker, Adriaan. 2004. Sophrosyne and the rhetoric of self-restraint: polysemy & persuasive use of an ancient Greek value term. Brill.
 Van Tongeren, Paul. 2001. "Nietzsche's revaluation of the cardinal virtues: The case of Sophrosyne." Phronimon: Journal of the South African Society for Greek Philosophy and the Humanities 3:128–49.

Concepts in ancient Greek ethics
Concepts in ancient Greek philosophy of mind
Personifications in Greek mythology
Religious ethics
Virtue
Words and phrases with no direct English translation
Children of Nyx
Greek goddesses